Diane Gamboa (born 1957) has been producing, exhibiting and curating visual art in Southern California since the 1980s. She has also been involved art education, ranging from after-school programs to college and university teaching. Gamboa has been "one of the most active cultural producers in the Chicana art movement in Los Angeles." She actively developed the Chicano School of Painting.

Early life and education
Gamboa had been producing art most of her life. She learned early on that Los Angeles was a city that was "fragmented" and "segregated by race, class and power." Recognizing this as a young person has informed much of her body of work. In 1984 Gamboa received her degree from Otis College of Art and Design.

Career and Work 
She is a recipient of a California Community Foundation Individual Artist Grant, and her  solo exhibitions include “Bruja–Ha” at Tropico de Nopal Gallery and “Chica Chic” at Patricia Correia Gallery in Santa Monica. Her work is included in Cheech Marin's personal collection of Chicano art and has been shown at the Los Angeles County Museum of Art and the Riverside Art Museum

ASCO, Punk and Paper Fashion 
In the early ‘80s, she photographically documented the East Los Angeles punk rock scene.  From 1980 to 1987, she was a member of ASCO, a conceptual multi-media performance art group. Gamboa appeared in performances and also created costumes and makeup concepts that "shaped the group's look."

Gamboa organized numerous site-specific "Hit and Run" paper fashion shows which were "created as easily disposable street wear." Her fascination with paper fashion can be traced to an ASCO fashion show organized by in 1982 by member Gronk, where he insisted all entries must be made of paper. Her paper fashion shows disrupted the activities of people on the street, blurring the lines between art and everyday life. Gamboa's creation of paper fashion is both the realization of childhood dreams of glamor and a commentary on the disposable nature of high fashion.

The "easily disposable streetwear" became quite popular and some designs were collected by museums. Gamboa created more than 75 different fashions, ranging from dresses, purses and cross-gender outfits. Her paper fashions make "clear that creativity is restricted only by the tools and the labor that are economically within reach...they exhibit longing for more fulfilling and creative social intercourse." However, while there is a desire to play out the glamorous nature of fashion, Gamboa's work also comments on the gendered nature of the fashion industry and the erotic norms of clothing.

Exploring Identity and Space 
During the ‘90s, Gamboa's work had a very strong sense of place, including fictional places which were "anti-sexist, anti-racist and anti-hetero-normative." In Pin Up, Gamboa explores male-female relationships through a series of ink drawings on vellum. She explores the intersection of gender in the body and the relationships between the body and the inanimate. Many of the figures depicted in this series are tattooed, which reflects an interest Gamboa has in learning to tattoo others herself.

The Endangered Species series builds on the work started with the Pin Up drawings, turning the ink drawings into in a three-dimensional form.

The Bruja-Ha series was created around 2004. The art included in "Bruja-Ha" represents some of the very spiritual and performance-related aspects of Gamboa's work. Dirt from her father's grave was mixed into the paint, making it a very personal statement. Gamboa relates that her father had been ill during the time she had been working on "Bruja-Ha."

The Invasion of the Snatch (2007) is a series of 9 paintings that explore the feminine body and is Gamboa's "tribute" to unidentified female victims of rape and murder.

Gamboa's series, Alien Invasion: Queendom Come (2006-2012) is an exploration of Mexican identity in American culture. She explores the idea of "why only Mexicans are called aliens while others are called immigrants," creating drawings and paintings of blue-skinned, "Amazonian aliens." Alien Invasion invites viewers to rethink their ideas about immigrants, especially those of Latino origin.

References

Further reading
 "Timeless Tales," Review of exhibit at B-1 Gallery, Santa Monica, California. Artweek, June 4, 1992, back cover.
 Review of Exhibition at Williams Lamb Gallery, Los Angeles. Arts Magazine, November 1990, p. 125.
 Review of Exhibition at Natalie Bush Gallery, San Diego. ARTnews, May 1987, p. 52+
 "Art with a Chicano Accent" (article about historical and contemporary Chicano Art in Los Angeles). High Performance, Volume 9, #3, 1986, p. 40-5, 48-57.
 Diane Gamboa from Tropico de Nopal Gallery
 East L.A. Twist by Diane Gamboa

Living people
American contemporary painters
American artists of Mexican descent
Otis College of Art and Design alumni
1957 births
American women painters
Hispanic and Latino American women in the arts
21st-century American women artists